The 1997–98 UNC Charlotte 49ers men's basketball team represented the University of North Carolina at Charlotte in the 1997–98 college basketball season. This was head coach Melvin Watkins's second of two seasons at the helm of his alma mater. The 49ers competed in Conference USA and played their home games at Dale F. Halton Arena. They finished the season 20–11 (13–3 in C-USA play) and received an at-large bid to the 1998 NCAA tournament as No. 8 seed in the East region. The 49ers defeated Illinois-Chicago in the opening round before losing to No. 1 seed North Carolina, 93–83 in overtime, in the round of 32.

Roster

Schedule and results

|-
!colspan=9 style=| Regular season

|-
!colspan=9 style=| C-USA tournament

|-
!colspan=9 style=| NCAA tournament

Rankings

References

Charlotte 49ers men's basketball seasons
Charlotte
Charlotte
Charlotte 49ers men's basket
Charlotte 49ers men's basket